Cyriotasiastes rhetenor is a species of beetle in the family Cerambycidae, and the only species in the genus Cyriotasiastes. It was described by Newman in 1842.

References

Lamiini
Beetles described in 1842